Wizen is a surname. Notable people with the surname include:

 Boris Wizen, a character in the game Suikoden II
 Effi Wizen (born 1956), Israeli computer animator and visual effects specialist
 Ridley Wizen, a character in the game Suikoden II